Beeda Masthan Rao Yadav is an Indian politician and businessman. He was Member of Legislative Assembly from Kavali Constituency, Andhra Pradesh. He was elected to the Rajya Sabha in 2022.

Profile
Dr. Beeda Masthan Rao Yadav was born to Sri Beeda Ramanaiah and Smt. Beeda Bujjamma garu on 2-7-1958 in Iskapalli, a remote coastal village of Allur Mandal, SPSR Nellore District, Andhra Pradesh. Sri Beeda Ramanaiah served as Sarpanch of Iskapalli Panchyat from 1980 to 1988. He was Director of Land Mortgage Bank (LMB), Nellore from 1981 to 1984. Sri Beeda Ramanaiah was also President of Water Users’ Association of Allur Bit 3 from 1996 to 2003.

	Dr. Beeda Masthan Rao Yadav married Manjula garu in 1987 and has two children. 

	Dr. Beeda Masthan Rao Yadav has 2 elder sisters and 2 younger sisters. His eldest sister Smt. Devarala Masthanamma was Corporator of 10th ward of Nellore Municipal Corporation from 2014 to 2019. Her husband, Devarala Subramanyam served as Chairman of Kavali Agriculture Market Committee from 2015 to 2017. His second sister, Dr. Masthanamma is a medical doctor in Tenali who was also a chairperson of Tenali Municipality from 2005 to 2008.

Business
Dr. Beeda Masthan Rao Yadav is a well-known name in the aquaculture community.

He ventured into the seafood industry in 1991, Dr. Beeda Masthan Rao Yadav started BMR Group. With over 32 years of presence, BMR Group has the distinction of having its roots in all the wings of aquaculture – brood-stock multiplication centre, hatchery, farming, shrimp feed manufacturing, processing etc.

Presently, Dr. Beeda Masthan Rao Yadav is the Chairman of BMR Group of Industries.

With a modest beginning with shrimp farming on family land in Iskapalli in 1991, he pursued his business on professional lines, with innovative ideas and hard work.

Dr. Beeda Masthan Rao Yadav expanded his group into 400 hectors farming, 12 hatcheries, shrimp processing unit, a feed plant and a brood stock multiplication centre. 

BMR Group is one of the largest seed suppliers, with 5.5 billion annual seed production, winning the “Best Vannamei Hatchery in India” award by MPEDA, Govt. of India in 2015.

The group exports about 6500 Mt of world class shrimp products annually. The feed plant produces high-quality feed at economically viable prices to the farmers.

In 1997, he started a P.Monodon shrimp seed production centre in Andaman in association with Central Agricultural Research Institute, Govt. of India.

His extraordinary contribution to Aqua Industry is the introduction of Shrimp L-Vannamie exotic species in India, changing the face of the industry. This has resulted in India becoming the second largest exporter of shrimp in the world market with an export value of Rs. 30420 crores per year, transforming farmers into entrepreneurs and bringing prosperity to many stakeholders, primarily in rural India.

Being a member of various policy making bodies in the government, he was instrumental in formulating policies that had greatly supported the aqua farmers and industry.  His suggestions influenced governments for formulation of pro-aqua policies like subsidized power, grants-in-aid to new industries, subsidized supply of fishing nets and boats to fishermen, subsidies for setting up of cold storages, reefer containers etc.

In recognition of his efforts, he is fondly called as “Father of Vannamie” in India.

Dr. Beeda Masthan Rao served as President of Shrimp Feed Manufacturers Association (SFMA) up to the year 2022.

Impact on business
♦ The introduction of Vannamie species has had a tremendous positive impact not only on Aqua Industry but also on rural economy of India as a whole.

♦ It brought back number of farmers to aquaculture apart from encouraging new entrants - Rural India is a buzz again, thanks to the innovative contribution of Dr. Beeda Masthan Rao Yadav.

♦ As a result, production of shrimp has gone up from 1,04,218 MT in 2008 to 8,00,000 MT in 2021.

♦ Farming area has gone up from 80,000 hectares to 1,60,000 hectares, which is 100% increase. Productivity has gone up from 0.94 MT/HA in 2009-10 to 5.00 MT/HA in 2021.
 
♦ Thus, India became second largest shrimp exporter with volumes leaping from 67000 MT in 2009 to 8,00,000 MT in 2021 and foreign exchange earnings too gone up from Rs.10048.53 crores to Rs.30420.83 crores.

♦ The increase in shrimp farming area, productivity and production created avenues for establishment of more hatcheries, processing plants, feed manufacturing units and ice plants apart from giving a thrust to other agri-based products like soya, wheat flour etc. The supporting industries involved in the manufacturing of packing materials, transport vehicles, spare parts have also got a boost.

♦ The above developments in Aqua industry created rural employment directly for about 50,000 and indirectly to 1,00,000 members, improving the living standards of people in rural India.

Political career
2001 to 2006		:	ZPTC Member of Bogole Mandal, SPSR Nellore District;

2004 to 2006		:	Chairman of Prasanna Venkateswara Swamy Temple, Konda Bitragunta;

2004			    :	Contested as Member of AP Legislative Assembly from Allur Constituency;

2009 to 2014		:	a)Member of Legislative Assembly from Kavali Constituency, Andhra Pradesh,
						b) Member, AP Legislative Committee on BC Welfare;
						c) Chairman of the Standing Committee on Labour, Factories, Employment and Training, Tourism; and Information Technology.;

2014 to 2019		:	Advisory Member of Capital Region Development Authority, of Government of Andhra Pradesh.;

2019			    :	Contested for Nellore Lok Sabha;

2022                :  	Elected as Member of Parliament ( Rajya Sabha);

2022			    :	Member, Consultative Committee for the 	Ministry of Commerce & Industry, Government of India;

Philanthropy
Dr. Beeda Masthan Rao Yadav is an active social worker.  He started ‘BMR Charitable Trust’, operating through its own Group funds serving more than about 3 lakhs population in Nellore District, both in rural and urban areas. Its activities cover health, education, empowerment of women, skills development, strengthening social welfare hostels, housing, supply of safe drinking water, and sports etc. He provided employment to 6000 youth in his Group leading to their comfortable and secured life, improving their living standards and social status, paving way to a better tomorrow for them. Notable services are:

♦ Provided employment for about 6000 directly and 15000 indirectly

♦ Organized medical and mega medical camps benefiting more than 10000 rural people.

♦ Eye testing has been organized for about 75000 poor, performed 16000 free surgeries, supply of free glasses and medicines to the patients

♦ Donated Rupees Ten lakhs to Saraswathi Nidhi a corpus created by the District Collector, Nellore for imparting corporate education to rural poor

♦ Organized free bus for remote rural students

♦ Support to poor students with tuition fee from Primary to PG and for professional courses

♦ Provided additional class rooms in school and colleges.

♦ Sponsored seminars, conference and workshops in Fisheries College, Muthukur and Vikrama Simhapuri University, Nellore; and instituted 2 gold medals for the best performing students in Vikrama Simhapuri University.

♦ Sponsored national and state level sport meets, provided free sports kits and training, extended financial support to sports persons

♦ Provided safe drinking water through RO Plants and organized tree guards and plantation in villages.

♦ Supported to the marginalized communities and rural poor for their livelihood

♦ “Pedalandariki Illu Scheme”: Inspired by the ideology of distribution of house site pattas by the Hon’ble Chief Minister, Sri Y.S. Jagan Mohan Reddy garu,under Pedalandariki Illu Scheme, Dr. Beeda Masthan Rao Yadav has purchased Ac. 8.00 cents of land for an amount of Rs. 1.20 crores in Iskapalli village, Allur Mandal, Nellore district for handing it over to the Collector & District Magistrate, Nellore for allotment to the poor beneficiaries identified by our Government, under Pedalandariki Illu Scheme. Around 533 fishermen, SC, ST, BC & Minority beneficiaries will be benefitted with 1½ cents of house site each.

♦ "Nadu – Nedu Programme":Turning a new leaf over education sector, Hon’ble Chief Minister Sri Y.S. Jagan Mohan Reddy garu has launched the 'Nadu-Nedu' Programme which aims at transforming government schools into vibrant and competitive institutions. Inspired by the efforts of our beloved Chief Minister, Dr. Beeda Masthan Rao Yadav has purchased Ac. 3.10 cents for Rs. 10.00 lakhs from Salt Department, Government of India, to donate to the ZP High School, Iskapalli under ‘Nadu Nedu’ Programme for using as playground, and the land will be handed over soon. Provided tables and chairs to the ZP High School, Iskapalli for Rs. 5.50 lakhs. Supported SC Boys Hostels & BC Boys Hostels with toilets, fans, books, bags and furniture, inverters and batteries, for continuous power supply with Rs. 4.00 lakhs.

♦ "Support to Infrastructure Development in Coastal Areas of Kavali Constituency": Handed over Ac. 28.00 cents, worth of Rs. 2.80 crores to the fishermen in Iskapalli for construction of drying platforms and other livelihoods purposes, & Hon’ble Former Minister Sri Mopidevi Venkataramana has also laid foundation to drying platform. Ac. 5.47 cents in Pathapalem Kothur, costing Rs. 82.05 lakhs was given to fishermen of Iskapalli village. Supported 856 beneficiaries of SC, ST, BC, Minorities and others for whom houses are sanctioned, with Rs. 10,000 each for supporting the poor to carry on construction up to basement level. Thus, an amount of Rs. 85.50 lakhs is contributed for housing in Kavali Constituency. Donated Ac. 1.25 cents in Sy. No. 336, costing 15 lakhs to construct Marine Police Station in Iskapalli.Registered Ac. 2.6 cents in Sy. Nos. 335-1 & 315-A, costing Rs. 25.00 lakhs of land to Tourism Department for construction of Resorts in coastal area of Iskapalli village.Ac. 1.00 cents in Sy. No. 335-2 in Iskapalli village, costing Rs. 15.00 lakhs was given to Government of India in 2006 for construction of Light House. Built 12 RO water plants in Kavali and Kovur Constituencies with Rs. 60.00 lakhs, @ Rs. 5.00 lakhs each. Supported Veterinary Hospital building, PHC Building in Iskapalli village.

♦ "Skills Development Trainings": Inspired by the ideology of Hon’ble Chief Minister Sri Y.S. Jagan Mohan Reddy garu for building a sustainable skilling Ecosystem in Andhra Pradesh, BMR Charitable Trust entered in to MoU  with Andhra Pradesh State Skill Development Corporation (APSSDC) to promote skill development and entrepreneurship in Fishery Sector for imparting employable skills to unemployed youth trough placement linked skill development training in Fisheries sector. BMR Trust has trained 600 rural unemployed youth and placed them in various export, processing, feed manufacturing companies of fisheries, with which BMR Trust has MoUs, in and around Nellore district. Organized computer trainings to the rural youth, conducted self-employment vocational course for imparting tailoring training, soft skills etc in rural areas. Conducted Entrepreneurship Development Training to unemployed youth who are aspiring to start industries, provided forward and backward linkages.

♦ "Relief Operations during Covid-19"BMR Charitable Trust has supplied essential commodities like rice, 5 types of provisions (edible oil, red gram, tamarind, red chilies, and tamarind) to around 50,000 families in 3 Assembly Constituencies, viz., Kavali, Kovur and Kandukur, with a total cost of Rs. 1.50 crores.Sri. Ramireddy Pratap Kumar Reddy, Sri N. Prasanna Kumar Reddy, Sri. M. Mahidar Reddy, respective MLAs of Kavali, Kovur and Kandukur have distributed the commodities in their Constituencies to the poor, affected by pandemic.Provided 200 Oxygen Concentrators, worth of Rs. 2.25 crores, to the District Collector, Nellore through Hon’ble the then Ministers of Nellore, Sri. P. Anil Kumar Yadav and Late Sri. M. Gowtham Reddy, for meeting the needs of PHCs, CHCs, and Area Hospitals of Nellore District.  obilized Rs. 1.00 crores from Aquaculture Exporters of Nellore district and contributed to the Collector & District Magistrate’s fund at Nellore, for Covid – 19 relief operations and presented in the presence of Hon’ble Former Minister Sri P. Anil Kumar Yadav. Mobilized Rs. 20.00 lakhs from Prawn Hatcheries Association of Nellore and contributed to the Collector, Nellore. Presented Rs. One crore to the Hon’ble Chief Minister for Chief Minister Relief Fund (CMRF) for covid-19 relief operations.
 
♦ "Cyclone Relief in November 2021" : Presented Rs. One crore to the Hon’ble Chief Minister for Chief Minister Relief Fund (CMRF) for meeting cyclone relief operations in Nellore district in November 2021.

Awards

International 

Honorary Doctorate Degree, the International University of Contemporary Studies, Washington DC, USA, 1998.
 
National

“Best Hatchery in India” by MPEDA, Ministry of Commerce & Industry, Government of India for 2015.

“Indian of the Year, 2017 - Aqua Culture” from Shri. Suresh Prabhu, Hon’ble the then Union Minister for Railways. This award was instituted by the Brands Academy. 

Life Time Achievement Award 2022, from India International Aquaculture Expo, Chennai

References 

Andhra Pradesh MLAs 2009–2014
1958 births
Living people
Rajya Sabha members from Andhra Pradesh

YSR Congress Party politicians